John Yakubu is a former chairman of Esan North-East local government area. He was the running mate of Osagie Ize-Iyamu, the People's Democratic Party nominee in the 2016 Edo State gubernatorial election.

References

Living people
Peoples Democratic Party (Nigeria) politicians
People from Edo State
Year of birth missing (living people)